MorphX (also known as The Swarm or simply Swarm) is an action-adventure video game developed by Targem Games and published by Buka Entertainment in CIS territories and 505 Games in the west. A light gun shooter arcade game adaptation was released in 2013 by Global VR.

Synopsis 
In 2008, Earth was invaded by the alien swarm. Within the year, they had complete control of earth and had wiped out most of mankind. During 2009, the Swarm directed its effort to locate and wipe out the few remaining pockets of resistance. The year is now 2011, and mankind is still fighting to survive. Meanwhile, sightings of strange humanoid creatures are reported, their purpose unknown. Some believe they are the products of experiments the swarm has done on humans, while some believe it's the first of a new generation of swarm adapted to life on Earth.

In 2012, one of mankind's last bastions dubbed "The Laboratory", resides beneath the ruins of Moscow. There the survivors work tirelessly to stop this new threat.

References 

2008 video games
Action video games
Action-adventure games
Alien invasions in video games
Science fiction video games
Third-person shooters
Video games about extraterrestrial life
Video games developed in Russia
Windows games
Xbox 360 games
505 Games games
Single-player video games
Video games set in 2012
Video games set in the 2010s
Targem Games games
Buka Entertainment games